Karl Kaspar Keffer (1882 – October 22, 1955) was a Canadian professional golfer. He was the first and, as of 2019, remains the only Canadian-born winner of the Canadian Open.

Keffer was born in Tottenham, Ontario. He was the head professional at the Royal Ottawa Golf Club for over thirty years until his retirement in 1943 due to ill health, and was a founder member of the PGA of Canada. Until 1942, he also worked as the professional at Jekyll Island Club on Jekyll Island, Georgia during the winters. His biggest achievements as a tournament player came in the national open championship, which he won twice, in 1909 and 1914, and finished as runner-up in 1919. He also won the provincial opens of Manitoba and Quebec.

Keffer has been widely recognised for his achievements and contributions to golf, highlighted by his induction into the Canadian Golf Hall of Fame in 1986. He has also been inducted into the PGA of Canada, Ontario Golf and Quebec Golf halls of fame.

Professional wins
 1909 Canadian Open
 1914 Canadian Open
 1919 Manitoba Open
 1926 Quebec Open

References

External links
 Karl Keffer at the Canadian Golf Hall of Fame website
 Karl Keffer at the PGA of Canada Hall of Fame website
 Karl Keffer at the Golf Ontario website
 Karl Keffer at the Golf Quebec website

Canadian male golfers
Golfing people from Ontario
1882 births
1955 deaths